Apollonia was a city in ancient Lycia. Its ruins are located near Kiliçli (Sıçak), a small village in the Kaş district of Antalya Province, Turkey.

History

The city isn't mentioned by any ancient author. The pillar tombs in the necropolis to the north of the city attest to a Lycian origin of the settlement and date to about 500 BC.

In Roman times the city was part of a local federation, a sympoliteia, with Simena, Isinda and Aperlae. Aperlae was the leader of the sympolity, which was represented in the Lycian League with one vote.

The ruins of a Byzantine church possibly date to the 6th or 7th century AD, so the city was still occupied at that time.

Layout
The city is located on a hill and has a walled acropolis at its highest elevation. In the east the acropolis seems to be double because a much older stockade is located inside the Byzantine walls. Two churches, a theater, baths with cisterns and a heroon are found on the western and northwestern side of the acropolis. Houses were built on the southwestern side. Six pillar tombs and one larger monument are found around the acropolis.

References

External links
The Princeton Encyclopedia of Classical Sites

Ancient Greek archaeological sites in Turkey
Archaeological sites in Antalya Province
Former populated places in Turkey
Populated places in ancient Lycia
Roman sites in Turkey